Rochefort-en-Yvelines is a commune in the Yvelines department, part of the Rambouillet in the Île-de-France in France.

See also
Communes of the Yvelines department

References

Communes of Yvelines
Burial sites of the House of Rohan